Pulletikurru is a village in Ambajipeta Mandal in the Konaseema of Andhra Pradesh, India.

Pulletikurru is very near to  Kakinada and Rajamahendravaram Cities, it is 376 km distance from state main city Hyderabad of Telangana and 203 km distance from the capital of Andhra Pradesh Amaravathi, Guntur District.

Demographics
As of 2011 India census, Pulletikurru has a population of 9208 in 2447 households.

References

Villages in East Godavari district